Son Ah-seop (born March 18, 1988, in Busan, South Korea) is a South Korean professional baseball player for the Lotte Giants of the KBO League.

An outfielder, he is one of the most consistent hitters in the KBO, having hit above .300 ten years in a row (from 2010 to 2018), and winning the KBO League Golden Glove Award four consecutive times. His .322 lifetime batting average ranks in the top ten all-time for the KBO.

Son attended Busan High School. He led the KBO League in hits in 2012 and 2013.

International career 
He represented the South Korea national baseball team at the 2013 World Baseball Classic, 2014 Asian Games, 2015 Premier12, 2017 World Baseball Classic and 2018 Asian Games.

Television appearances
2021, King of Mask Singer (MBC): Contestant as "DDaeng" (episode 291)

References

External links 

Career statistics and player information from Korea Baseball Organization
Son A-seop at Lotte Giants Baseball Club

1988 births
Living people
Sportspeople from Busan
South Korean baseball players
Asian Games gold medalists for South Korea
Asian Games medalists in baseball
Baseball players at the 2014 Asian Games
Baseball players at the 2018 Asian Games
Busan High School alumni
KBO League outfielders
Lotte Giants players
Medalists at the 2014 Asian Games
Medalists at the 2018 Asian Games
2013 World Baseball Classic players
2015 WBSC Premier12 players
2017 World Baseball Classic players